Cleopatra is a 1912 American silent historical drama film starring Helen Gardner in the title role, and directed by Charles L. Gaskill, based on an 1890 play written by Victorien Sardou. It is the first film to be produced by Gardner's production company, The Helen Gardner Picture Players.

Cleopatra is one of the first six-reel feature films produced in the United States. Promoted as "The most beautiful motion picture ever made", it was the first to offer a feature-length depiction of Cleopatra, although there had been a short film about Antony and Cleopatra two years earlier.

Synopsis
In a series of elaborately staged tableaux, it depicts Cleopatra and her love affairs, first with handsome fisherman-slave Pharon, then with Mark Antony.

Cast
 Helen Gardner as Cleopatra - Queen of Egypt
 Mr. Howard as Pharon - A Greek slave and fisherman
 Charles Sindelar as Mark Antony - Triumvir and General
 James R. Waite as Venditius - A Roman soldier 
 Mr. Osborne as Diomedes - A rich Egyptian 
 Harry Knowles as Kephren - Captain of the Guards to the Queen 
 Mr. Paul as Octavius - A Triumvir and General
 Mr. Brady as Serapian - An Egyptian priest
 Mr. Corker as Ixias - Servant to Ventidius
 Pearl Sindelar as Iras - An attendant 
 Miss Fielding as Charmian - An attendant
 Miss Robson as Octavia - Wife of Antony
 Helene Costello as Nicola - Child

Production
Cleopatra was the first film produced by Helen Gardner's production company, The Helen Gardner Picture Players, located in Tappan, New York. Gardner created the company in 1910 after finding success in a series of early 1900s Vitagraph shorts.

The film's budget was $45,000 (approximately $ today) and featured lavish sets and costumes (Gardner also served as the film's costume designer and editor). Gardner used the natural Tappan scenery for outdoor shots in addition to sets.

Releases
Upon its release, Cleopatra played in opera houses and theatres. The film was also featured in a theatrical roadshow accompanied by a publicist, manager and a lecturer/projectionist.

In 1918, Gardner filmed additional scenes and re-issued the film to compete with the 1917 adaptation released by Fox and starring Theda Bara.

Reception
Film critic Dennis Schwartz described it as "energetic" while giving it a B− rating.

The film is recognized by American Film Institute in these lists:
 2002: AFI's 100 Years...100 Passions – Nominated

Censorship
Like many American films of the time, Cleopatra was subject to cuts by city and state film censorship boards. For the 1918 release, the Chicago Board of Censors required a cut of the two intertitles "If I let you live and love me ten days, will you then destroy yourself?" and "Suppose Anthony were told that she had just left the embraces of the slave Pharon".

Status and restorations
The 1912 version of Cleopatra still exists in its entirety. In 2000, Turner Classic Movies had the print restored, using an earlier 1960s restoration, and commissioned a new musical score from the husband and wife team of Chantal Kreviazuk and Raine Maida. The restored version, complete with color tinting, first aired on TCM in August 2000.

References

External links

 
 
 
 
 Cleopatra at silentera.com
 
  

1910s historical drama films
1912 films
American historical drama films
American silent feature films
American black-and-white films
Depictions of Cleopatra on film
Depictions of Mark Antony on film
American films based on plays
Films based on works by Victorien Sardou
Films set in ancient Egypt
Films set in the 1st century BC
Films shot in New York (state)
American independent films
Articles containing video clips
1910s independent films
1912 drama films
Censored films
1910s American films
Silent American drama films